Laff (legal name: Laff Media, LLC) is an American digital multicast television network headquartered in Atlanta, Georgia and is owned by the Katz Broadcasting subsidiary of the E. W. Scripps Company. The network specializes in comedy programming, featuring mainly sitcoms from the 1990s through the 2000s.

History
The network launched at Noon that day; the first program was the film My Mom's New Boyfriend.

Katz announced that television stations owned by ABC Owned Television Stations and 13 E. W. Scripps Company would serve as the network's charter affiliates; the former serving as a replacement for the standard definition feed of the Live Well Network, which with Laff's announcement also began to roll-back to only being carried by ABCOTS stations. On March 13, 2015, Katz Broadcasting announced an affiliation deal with the Cox Media Group to carry Laff on the subchannels of seven of its stations expanding its initial reach to 47% of the country. The following week on March 20, as part of a multi-network affiliation agreement with Katz, the Meredith Corporation announced that it would carry the network on two of its stations.

On February 13, 2015, Laff acquired the syndication rights to five sitcoms. Laff followed that deal for film licensing with Disney–ABC Domestic Television, Miramax, and Sony Pictures Television by March 17. Laff made a multi-year deal for five sitcoms with Carsey-Werner Productions in April 2016. Roseanne reruns were removed on May 29, 2018, after Roseanne Barr was fired from the show by ABC (which then continued on as The Conners); both decisions were based on a Roseanne Barr tweet considered racist.

A list of 2019 Nielsen ratings published by Variety indicated that Laff averaged 223,000 viewers in prime time, down 5% from the 2018 average.

The network moved off ABC Owned Television Stations at the beginning of 2021, in favor of new carriage on Scripps's recently-acquired Ion Media stations in place of the now-defunct Qubo, Ion Plus and Ion Shop networks.

Programming
Laff provides comedy programming to owned-and-operated and affiliated stations every day from 6:00 a.m. to 3:00 a.m. Eastern Time, with paid programming filling the remaining vacated hours. Laff's schedule mainly consists of 1980s, 1990s and 2000s off-network sitcoms. On September 1, 2021, Nexstar launched a direct competitor to Laff, Rewind TV, and the latter network replaced Laff on Nexstar stations (or will in the upcoming months if not immediately possible due to contractual obligations).

Movies
Laff carries a broad roster of comedy films on Saturdays and Sundays. The network's film lineup relies primarily on an extensive library of titles through several multi-year program licensing agreements with Walt Disney Studios (including 20th Century Studios titles), Warner Bros. Entertainment,  Universal Pictures, Paramount Pictures (including Miramax titles) / Trifecta Entertainment & Media, and Sony Pictures Entertainment (distributed by Sony Pictures Television).

Current programming
According to Jim
ALF
Funniest Pets & People (also aired on Qubo until it ceased operations on February 28, 2021)
Home Improvement
How I Met Your Mother
Just for Laughs: Gags
The Real McCoys
World's Funniest Videos: Top 10 Countdown
That '70s Show

Former programming
A Different World
Cybill
Drew Carey's Improv-A-Ganza
Ellen
Empty Nest
Everybody Hates Chris
Grace Under Fire
Grounded for Life
Night Court
Roseanne
Spin City
The Beverly Hillbillies
The Bernie Mac Show
The Dick Van Dyke Show
The Drew Carey Show
3rd Rock from the Sun

Affiliates 

, Laff has 425 current or pending affiliation agreements with television stations in 48 states, plus the District of Columbia, covering 91.3% of the United States.

References

External links
 

2015 establishments in the United States
Television networks in the United States
Television channels and stations established in 2015
Comedy television networks
Classic television networks
Nostalgia television in the United States
E. W. Scripps Company